Macrocneme maja is a moth of the subfamily Arctiinae. It was described by Johan Christian Fabricius in 1787. It is found in Pará, Brazil.

References

 

Macrocneme
Moths described in 1787